Michel Baulier (born  in Valdahon (Doubs)), is a retired French footballer.

A defender primarily for FC Metz and Olympique Marseille, he was also a player-coach at Gap FC between 1980 and 1981.

External links
 Player page at om1899.com
 Profile - FC Metz

1949 births
Living people
Sportspeople from Doubs
French footballers
French football managers
FC Metz players
Olympique de Marseille players
FC Sochaux-Montbéliard players
Association football defenders
Footballers from Bourgogne-Franche-Comté